Ward 9 Davenport is a municipal electoral division in Toronto, Ontario that has been represented in the Toronto City Council since the 2018 municipal election. It was last contested in 2022, with Alejandra Bravo being elected councillor.

History 
The ward was created in 2018 when the provincial government aligned Toronto's then-44 municipal wards with the 25 corresponding provincial and federal ridings. The current ward is an amalgamation of the old Ward 17 (northern section), the old Ward 18 (southern section), and part of the western edge of the old Ward 19.

2018 municipal election 
Ward 9 was first contested during the 2018 municipal election. Ana Bailão, who was Ward 18 councillor and a deputy mayor, was elected with 83.62 per cent of the vote.

Geography 
Davenport is part of the Toronto and East York community council. On its north side, the ward borders Canadian National Railway tracks, Eglinton Avenue and Dufferin Street; on its south and west sides, it borders Canadian Pacific Railway tracks; and on its east side, Davenport borders Winona Drive, Ossington Avenue, Dundas Street and Davenport Road.

The ward includes parts of west-end Toronto, and includes the neighbourhoods of Fairbank, Oakwood-Vaughan, St. Clair Gardens, Corso Italia, Dovercourt Village, Bloordale Village, Bloorcourt Village, Brockton Village, the Junction Triangle and the western part of Rua Acores.

Councillors

Election results

See also 

 Municipal elections in Canada
 Municipal government of Toronto
 List of Toronto municipal elections

References

External links 

 Councillor's webpage

Toronto city council wards
2018 establishments in Ontario